This is a list of the albedo features of the planet Mercury as seen by early telescopic observation.

Early telescopic observations of Mercury were based on the assumption that Mercury keeps one of its faces permanently turned toward the Sun, through the mechanism of tidal locking.  Although this is not true (Mercury rotates three times on its axis for every two revolutions around the Sun), when it is positioned for best viewing from Earth, the amount by which its visible face has rotated from its previous best viewing position is fairly small. 

A map of Mercury made in the 1910s by astronomer Eugène Michel Antoniadi shows the following albedo features, localized by a grid in which 0° longitude is the (assumed) subsolar meridian.  No certain connection has been made between these features and the topographic features viewed on Mercury by the Mariner 10 spacecraft.  Mariner 10, however, imaged less than half of Mercury's surface. 

The names are drawn from Greek mythology, and often allude to myths about Hermes, the Greek equivalent of the Roman god Mercury.

List of albedo features on Mercury 

The names of albedo features currently used by the Gazetteer of Planetary Nomenclature are largely based upon Antoniadi's names, but include several alterations; they also necessarily use a different coordinate grid.

The newer regional names are: Borea "Northern region"; Australia "Southern region"; and Tricrena, the name of a mountain near Pheneus in Arcadia.

Other changes are: all features named Vallis and Promontorium have been renamed Solitudo; Solitudo Argiphontae has been renamed Sinus Argiphontae ("bay of Argiphontes"); Admeti has been changed to Admetei (in error; there is no mythological figure Admeteus); Pleias has become Pleias Gallia.

Notes

Mercury (planet)-related lists